Bornhöved is an Amt ("collective municipality") in the district of Segeberg, in Schleswig-Holstein, Germany. The seat of the Amt is in Bornhöved.

The Amt Bornhöved consists of the following municipalities:

Bornhöved
Damsdorf 
Gönnebek 
Schmalensee 
Stocksee 
Tarbek 
Tensfeld

Ämter in Schleswig-Holstein
Segeberg